The 2016–17 Coppin State Eagles men's basketball team represented Coppin State University during the 2016–17 NCAA Division I men's basketball season. The Eagles, led by third-year head coach Michael Grant, played their home games at the Physical Education Complex in Baltimore, Maryland as members of the Mid-Eastern Athletic Conference. They finished the season 8–24, 7–9 in MEAC play to finish in a three-way tie for seventh place. They lost in the first round of the MEAC tournament to Howard.

On March 20, 2017, it was announced that head coach Michael Grant's contract would not be renewed. He finished at Coppin State with a three-year record of 25–69. The school hired Baltimore native and former Maryland All-American player Juan Dixon as the new head coach on April 22.

Previous season
The Eagles finished the 2015–16 season 9–22, 6–10 in MEAC play to finish in a three-way tie for ninth place. They defeated North Carolina A&T in the first round of the MEAC tournament to advance to the quarterfinals where they lost to South Carolina State.

Preseason 
The Eagles were picked to finish in 10th place in the preseason MEAC poll. Terry Harris, Jr. was named to the preseason All-MEAC third team.

Roster

Schedule and results

|-
!colspan=9 style=| Non-conference regular season

|-
!colspan=9 style=| MEAC regular season

|-
!colspan=9 style=| MEAC tournament

References

Coppin State Eagles men's basketball seasons
Coppin State
Coppin State Eagles men's basketball team
2017 in sports in Maryland